The Great Divide is a 1929 American pre-Code Western film directed by Reginald Barker and starring Dorothy Mackaill. Released in both silent and sound versions, it was produced and distributed by First National Pictures. The film is a remake of The Great Divide, made at MGM in 1925. There was another remake in 1931 as the full sound film Woman Hungry. All three films are based on the 1906 Broadway play The Great Divide by William Vaughn Moody.

A print of the film is preserved at the Library of Congress. Parts of the film were shot in Zion National Park in Utah.

Plot
Stephen Ghent, a mine owner, falls in love with Ruth Jordan, an arrogant girl from the East, unaware that she is the daughter of his dead partner. Ruth is vacationing in Arizona and Mexico with a fast set of friends, including her fiancé, Edgar. Manuela, a half-Spanish person hopelessly in love with Ghent, causes Ruth to return to her fiancé when she insinuates that Ghent belongs to her. Ghent follows Ruth, kidnaps her, and takes her into the wilderness to endure hardship. There she discovers that she loves Ghent, and she discards Edgar in favor of him.

Cast
 Dorothy Mackaill as Ruth Jordan
 Ian Keith as Steven Ghent
 Myrna Loy as Manuela
 Lucien Littlefield as Texas Tommy
 Creighton Hale as Edgar Blossom
 George Fawcett as Macgregor
 Claude Gillingwater as Winthrop Amesbury
 Roy Stewart as Joe Morgan

See also
 List of early Warner Bros. sound and talking features

Home media
The film was released on DVD on April 19, 2011, through the Warner Archive Collection series.

References

External links
 
 
 Original lobby poster

1929 films
1929 Western (genre) films
1920s English-language films
American black-and-white films
American films based on plays
Films directed by Reginald Barker
Films produced by Robert North
Films shot in Utah
First National Pictures films
Remakes of American films
Silent American Western (genre) films
Sound film remakes of silent films
Transitional sound Western (genre) films
Warner Bros. films
1920s American films